The 2007 World Netball Championships was the 12th edition of the INF Netball World Cup, a quadrennial premier event in international netball co-ordinated by the International Federation of Netball Associations (IFNA). Sixteen nations contested the title from 10 to the 17 November. It was held in the West Auckland, New Zealand. Forty-eight matches over 8 days were played in The Trusts Stadium, Waitakere. The event was broadcast to over half a dozen countries 

Australia defended its eighth title to defeat the home side, New Zealand, 42–38.

Withdrawal of hosting rights 
 
After seeing off competing bids from Australia and South Africa, Fiji was awarded the hosting rights for the 2007 World Netball Championships in November 2003. Fiji was the second Pacific nation selected to host the competition. New Zealand debuted the distinction having hosted in 1975 and followed in 1999.

During eleven days from 10 July to 21 July 2007, 16 teams contested for the title. Hosting costs became an issue with a forecast of F$3 million. the International Netball Federation (INFA) noted in a press release that the economic gain is significant, as Jamaica's economy had benefited significantly from a commensurate influx of sports tourists.

In December 2006, following months of tension, Commander Voreqe (Frank) Bainimarama staged a military coup to unseat the government of Prime Minister Laisenia Qarase.

As a direct result of the coup and the political and economic uncertainty it created, on December 8, 2006 the IFNA withdrew Fiji's hosting rights for the 2007 edition. The popularity of netball was expected to have a significant impact in Fiji so withdrawal of hosting rights was a significant action.

IFNA announced a new host on December 23, 2006 that New Zealand, who last hosted the tournament in 1999 in Christchurch, would host the tournament during November 2007. It was undecided if Auckland or Christchurch would hold the tournament, as both cities have suitable facilities. But on 27 January it was decided that Auckland would be the host city for the 2007 competition .The matches would all be played at The Trusts Stadium, Waitakere from 10 to 17 November.

Nations

Format
The tournament comprised 48 games, held over an 8-day period. Every team was guaranteed to play 6 games, and every team would be awarded a rank from 1 to 16 as a result.

Pool Stage
Points are awarded as follows:
• 2 Points for a Win
• 1 Points for a Draw
• 0 Points for a Loss
In the event of a tie, the result of the game between the tied teams would be decided who was ranked higher.  Tie situations would be resolved in three tie-breaker scenarios:
• The team with the superior Goal Average (Goals For/Goals Against) will be ranked highest. 
• If the Goal Average is identical, the team with the better Goal Difference will be ranked highest.
• If the Goal Difference is identical, the team with the higher Goals For will be ranked highest.

All times are New Zealand Time (UCT +13 hours)

Pool A

 Highlighted teams advanced to the quarter-finals. Remaining teams will contest classification matches.

Pool B

Pool C

Points Table

Pool D

Points Table

Section Games
After the pool stages, the teams are divided into two sections. The top 2 qualifiers from each pool go into Section 1-8, and the bottom two go into Section 9-16.

In the sectional games, no draws are permitted, so Extra Time is played. Extra Time operates as follows:
• Initially, extra time of two, seven minute halves will be played. 
• In the event of a tie remaining at the end of extra time, teams change ends without an interval and the game is restarted by the team entitled to the next centre pass.
• Play will then continue until one team has a two-goal advantage.

Section 9-16
Quarter Finals

Semi-Finals

Position Playoffs

Section 1-8
Quarter Finals

Semi-Finals

Position Playoffs

Final Placings

Medallists

References

External links 
official site of the 2007 WNC

Netball World Cup
    
World Championships
Netball Championships
World
November 2007 sports events in New Zealand
Sports competitions in Auckland
2000s in Auckland
West Auckland, New Zealand